Loei Pittayakom School  (commonly called: Loeipit)() is a Loei Province Special secondary school in the Province. It is in the Lakmuang campus. Under the Office of the Secondary Educational Service Area Office 19.

History 
Loei Pittayakom school that combines Satri Loei schools. (Loei Women's School) with Samosorn Wittayalai School (Loei Men's School) According to the announcement of the Department of Education on March 24, 1972, in order to comply with the policy of the Department of Extraordinary Education. (Department of General Education) to improve public schools nationwide into a large school. By any government school of any province, if considered In the year 1972, the Ministry of Education also included the provincial boarding school and the female provincial boarding school. In the same period, other provinces included the provincial boarding school. Both men and women are the same school as Saraburi Wittayakom School, Singburi School, Phichit Pittayakom School. The school is located in Tak province. It has to move from the same place with only 23 rai (the school in Loei today) to the school. The area of 81 rai 2 ngan 04 5/10

After the announcement of Mr. Somsin Tanasut, Loei Provincial Education Commissioner, has moved the school during the semester, but Mr. Chalerm Jiranat, head of the college club. He is the head of the school. At the beginning of teaching in 1972, there were 35 classrooms, including 1,468 students, 758 male, 710 female teachers, 61 teachers, and Dr. Sawasdi Panich. The Director General of the Department of Extraordinary Education and Mr. Vijin Suthawatta, Governor of Loei Province The school was opened on June 8, 1972. In 1975, the school taught 2 turns. In 1976, the school joined the program. 2521 transferred 2 high school students from Mueang Loei School and changed the education system from 7: 3: 2 to 6: 3: 3.

Course 
Loei Pittayakom School offers the following classes.

Junior high school level 
 Science-Science Program
 Study Plan for Science - English
 Study Plan for English Language Arts
 Gifted Education Program (Gifted)
 English for Academic Purposes (EP-English Program)

High school level 
 Study Plan - Visual Music and Technology
 Study Plan - Calculate (Math and English)
 Science-Math Program
 Science-Math Special Program (SM)
 Special Science Project, Science, Mathematics, Science and Technology (SC)
 Intensive Chinese-English Program (ICE)

O-NET average  
This is O-NET average of Loei Pittayakom School in 5 Basic Subject. They are Math, Science, Social study, English and Thai language. This is the national test of grade 12 in secondary level.

Director names

References

Secondary schools in Thailand
Schools in Loei Province